David Hayter is a Canadian-American actor, screenwriter, director, and producer. He is well known as the English-language voice actor for Solid Snake and Naked Snake in the Metal Gear video game series. He wrote the film X-Men and co-wrote X2 and Watchmen, and was awarded the Saturn Award for Best Writing in 2000 for his work on X-Men. Hayter voices King Shark on The Flash.

Early life
Hayter's father, Stephen, worked in the pharmaceutical industry. David Hayter started acting at the age of nine. He spent most of his childhood living around the world, and moved to Kobe at the age of 15, graduating from its international Canadian Academy in 1987. After this, he attended Rensselaer Polytechnic Institute for two years until transferring to the Toronto Metropolitan University in Toronto. He stayed there until the age of 20, when he moved to Hollywood.

Career

Early acting career 
Hayter did some live acting in the early 1990s, most notably in an episode of the sitcom Major Dad, but soon became more interested in voice acting and later landed the role of Captain America in the popular 1994 Spider-Man animated series. He also provided the voice of Arsène Lupin III in the English version of the anime film The Castle of Cagliostro and the voice of Tamahome in the English version of the anime series Fushigi Yūgi. He also starred in the 1994, straight-to-video movie, Guyver: Dark Hero, as the protagonist, Sean Barker (a role he took over from the previous actor, Jack Armstrong); Hayter has since gone-on to use the character's name as an alias in various work credits.

Metal Gear Solid series 

Hayter began providing the English voice of Metal Gear series protagonist Solid Snake in the 1998 video game Metal Gear Solid, which also served as the series's transition from 2D to 3D. Hayter would go on to play Solid Snake and his progenitor Naked Snake throughout all the succeeding installments (including spinoffs, re-releases and adaptations) up to and including Metal Gear Solid: Peace Walker (2010). Hayter also has an extended live-action cameo as himself in one of the fictional TV programs prior to the start of Metal Gear Solid 4: Guns of the Patriots (2008); where he wears the "Solid Eye", the technologically advanced eye patch that the main character wears throughout the game. Outside the Metal Gear series, Hayter also voiced the character in Super Smash Bros. Brawl (2008).

His work with the Metal Gear series has also led Hayter to do voice work in other video game projects such as Eternal Darkness: Sanity's Requiem and Star Wars: The Old Republic. He cited the series as an influence on his screenwriting, stating that "Kojima and I have different styles," "but I've certainly learned things from him, especially about ambiguity and telling a story without giving all the answers."

Hayter is one of the few Metal Gear actors to have played and completed the games he's voiced in. According to Paul Eiding, Hayter gave up half of his own paycheck in order to bring back the cast of the original Metal Gear Solid for the 2004 remake Metal Gear Solid: The Twin Snakes.

Following the announcement of Metal Gear Solid V: The Phantom Pain in the 2013 Game Developers Conference, Hayter announced that he was not asked to reprise as the main character for this entry. This was later confirmed when Konami announced that Kiefer Sutherland would be the character's voice during E3 the same year. Hayter has since revealed in an interview that he had to re-audition for the role suggesting that the series' creator Hideo Kojima was already considering recasting the part much earlier, with Kurt Russell (Snake Plissken in Escape from New York and Escape from L.A.) having been allegedly offered the role during the development of Metal Gear Solid 3: Snake Eater (2004).

After Kojima's departure from Konami, Hayter would reprise the role in a Metal Gear Solid-themed advertisement for the 2016 Ford Focus SE aired in 2016. In 2018, Hayter provided the character's voice in two video games: Super Bomberman R (which added two playable characters based on both Solid Snake and Naked Snake in an update) and Super Smash Bros. Ultimate.

Filmmaking 
In 2000, he wrote the screenplay for the movie version of X-Men, for which he was awarded the 2000 Saturn Award for Best Writing, and then went on to co-write the screenplay for its sequel X2 with writing team Michael Dougherty and Dan Harris. Shortly after his work on X-Men, Hayter was hired to write and direct a project based on the heroine Black Widow. However, due to the limited success of similar themed films featuring female vigilante protagonists at the time, Marvel withdrew their offer to Hayter stating, "We don't think it's time to do this movie". Hayter's daughter Natasha, born whilst he was writing the Black Widow script, is named after the titular character.

Hayter also wrote an adaptation of the graphic novel Watchmen by Alan Moore and David Gibbons. Noted for being a harsh critic of translations of his works to film, Moore said of the script "David Hayter's screenplay was as close as I could imagine anyone getting to [a film version of] Watchmen. That said, I shan't be going to see it. My book is a comic book. Not a movie, not a novel. A comic book. It's been made in a certain way, and designed to be read a certain way." Hayter and writer Alex Tse shared credit on the finished screenplay. Tse drew "the best elements" from two of the project's previous drafts written by Hayter. The script did not keep the contemporary atmosphere that Hayter created, but instead returned to the original Cold War setting of the Watchmen comic. Warner Bros. was amenable to the 1980s setting, and the director also added a title montage sequence to introduce the audience to the events of alternate history United States in that time period.

On September 7, 2012, it was announced that Hayter would pen the screen adaptation Caught Stealing, and would star Patrick Wilson and Alec Baldwin.

On September 13, 2012, Hayter began filming on his directorial debut, Wolves.

On July 8, 2013, Hayter was hired by Lakeshore Entertainment to write the film The Sword, based on the Image Comics series.

Television
On August 7, 2013, it was announced Hayter was developing a television show on Fox tentatively titled World War III, about a fiction global conflict that chronicles "a perfect storm of world events places us in the center of a global battle which may bring the world as we know it to an end." Hayter will be writing the series' story bible and pilot episode, as well as producing and serving as showrunner.

On September 28, 2018, Hayter announced he was co-writing and producing the upcoming Netflix series Warrior Nun, based on the 1994 comic book series Warrior Nun Areala, with Simon Barry serving as series creator and showrunner. Season 1 debuted on Netflix on July 2, 2020.

On January 31, 2022, it was announced that Hayter would be writing and producing a television adaptation of the 2000 video game American McGee's Alice.

Filmography

Anime (English dubbing)

Animation

Video games

Live action

Acting roles

Webshow

References

External links 

 
 
 
 David Hayter Geeks Out with NERDSociety 
 10 Questions: David Hayter at IGN
 This Week In Geek Interview with David Hayter
 Audio Interview (2010) with The Rafferty/Mills Connection podcast
 David Hayter Discusses Watchmen at AMCtv.com
 

American male child actors
Canadian male child actors
American male film actors
Canadian male film actors
Canadian male television actors
Canadian male voice actors
American male screenwriters
Canadian male screenwriters
American male television actors
American male video game actors
American male voice actors
Disney people
Walt Disney Animation Studios people
Marvel Comics people
Konami people
American people of Canadian descent
Living people
20th-century American male actors
20th-century Canadian male actors
21st-century American male actors
21st-century Canadian male actors
21st-century Canadian screenwriters
21st-century Canadian male writers
Toronto Metropolitan University alumni
Rensselaer Polytechnic Institute alumni
Year of birth missing (living people)